Lena N. Swanson (born October 1, 1937) is an American politician and activist who served as a member of the Washington State Senate, representing the 35th district in 1997. A member of the Democratic Party, she was appointed to fill the vacancy created by Brad Owen's resignation to become lieutenant governor in February 1997 and was subsequently defeated by conservative Democrat Tim Sheldon later that same year.

References 

Living people
1930s births
Year of birth uncertain
People from Bremerton, Washington
Democratic Party Washington (state) state senators
Women state legislators in Washington (state)
20th-century American politicians
20th-century American women politicians
21st-century American women